Do Lado de Fora is a 2014 Brazilian comedy film directed by Alexandre Carvalho, starring André Bankoff, Marcello Airoldi, Luis Fernando Vaz and Mauricio Evanns.

The film follows the story of two teenagers who decide to go to the São Paulo Gay Pride Parade, encouraged by the uncle of one of them, a successful executive who lives a double life. After witnessing a scene of homophobic aggression, they decide to make a pact: everyone in the group must come out of the closet until the following year's event.

Cast
 André Bankoff as Roger
 Marcello Airoldi as Vicente
 Luis Fernando Vaz as Mauro
 Mauricio Evanns as Rodrigo
 Silvetty Montilla
 Titi Muller

References

External links
 

Brazilian comedy films
Brazilian LGBT-related films
2014 comedy films
2014 LGBT-related films
Films shot in São Paulo
Films set in São Paulo
2014 films
LGBT-related comedy films
Gay-related films
2010s Portuguese-language films